The 1906 Wimbledon Championships took place on the outdoor grass courts at the All England Lawn Tennis and Croquet Club in Wimbledon, London, United Kingdom. The tournament ran from 25 June until 5 July. It was the 30th staging of the Wimbledon Championships, and the first Grand Slam tennis event of 1906.

Finals

Men's singles

 Laurence Doherty defeated  Frank Riseley, 6–4, 4–6, 6–2, 6–3

Women's singles

 Dorothea Douglass defeated  May Sutton, 6–3, 9–7

Men's doubles

 Frank Riseley /  Sydney Smith defeated  Laurence Doherty /  Reginald Doherty, 6–8, 6–4, 5–7, 6–3, 6–3

References

External links
 Official Wimbledon Championships website

 
Wimbledon Championships
Wimbledon Championships
Wimbledon Championships
Wimbledon Championships